Bloodstock Open Air is a British heavy metal festival held annually at Catton Hall in Walton-on-Trent, Derbyshire, since 2005.

Originally held indoors for one day with two stages, the festival started in 2001 at the Derby Assembly Rooms and has expanded over the years. It became an outdoor event in 2005. By 2019, it had five stages and a capacity of 15,000.

History
Originally on one stage only, the festival expanded to incorporate a second stage in 2006. Known simply as The Unsigned Stage, it was designed to provide a platform for the next generation of metal talent to reach a wider audience. In 2010 it was renamed The New Blood Stage.

2007 saw further expansion with the addition of a third stage, originally called The Lava Stage, which in 2009 became the Sophie Lancaster Stage. In 2010 the capacity of this stage was increased and it became the festival's second stage.

Bloodstock Open Air was conceived as an extension of the original Bloodstock indoor festival which ran from 2001 until 2006 at Derby Assembly Rooms. After an amicable parting in 2006 with his business partner Vince Brotheridge, in 2007 Paul Gregory brought his daughters Vicky Hungerford, Rachael Greenfield and son Adam Gregory on board as directors.

In 2010, Heaven & Hell was scheduled to headline Bloodstock Open Air, but pulled out due to the death of singer Ronnie James Dio. The main stage at the festival was subsequently renamed as the "Ronnie James Dio stage" in tribute to him.

The 2020 festival was planned to be a celebration of "20 years of Bloodstock" however the festival was postponed due to the COVID-19 pandemic. Ticket holders were given the option either to have a refund on their ticket or to roll it over to the 2021 festival which saw three stages expanded to include an extra day.

Bloodstock has hosted numerous metal bands from the following countries/dependencies: Argentina, Australia, Austria, Belgium, Brazil, Bulgaria, Canada, Chile, Colombia, Costa Rica, Croatia, Cyprus, Denmark, Egypt, England, Faroe Islands, Finland, France, Germany, Gibraltar, Greece, India, Indonesia, Northern Ireland, Republic of Ireland, Israel, Italy, Japan, Latvia, Lebanon, Luxembourg, Mexico, Nepal, Netherlands, New Zealand, Norway, Poland, Portugal, Romania, Russia, Scotland (including Shetland Islands), Slovenia, South Africa, Spain, Sweden, Switzerland, Taiwan, Ukraine, USA, Wales, and Guernsey.

On 15 October 2021, Vicky Hungerford, took a step back from her director role due to backlash from a tweet she sent that was deemed to be transphobic. The tweet that read "If you're going to start putting pronouns on your emails so I can refer to you as he/him she or her I'm binning your emails." was soon deleted after the backlash and was replaced with an apology. In addition, the Sophie Lancaster Foundation issued a statement saying that they will be meeting with Bloodstock to discuss their future relationship.

Paul Watling also announced that he would be stepping down from his role saying that "this is not an isolated incident" and "You can NOT promote a festival of inclusivity without including EVERYONE".

Bloodstock UK Metalfest
Bloodstock originally began as an indoor festival held in Derby Assembly Rooms which ran for six years, 2001 to 2006. In order to associate the festival roots with Derby, where founder Paul Gregory lives, the festival's mascot/logo was based on the tale of The Derby Ram; a beast so large that, when a butcher finally slaughtered it, he drowned in the Ram's blood.  A competition was run to name the beast and 'S-tan' was selected, he has appeared on almost all Bloodstock artwork since only missing from the first three BOA festivals when the S-tan snake featured instead.

2001
The first year was a one-day event headlined by Saxon, whom Paul Gregory had known personally since being commissioned to do the artwork for their 1984 Crusader album.  Attendance for the festival topped 700 people and, despite taking an (expected) financial loss, a second festival was arranged for the following year.

2002
2002 saw Blind Guardian headlining, again a band Paul Gregory knew through producing their artwork, which was their first UK show.  Bringing metal acts to the UK for the first time become a regular occurrence for Bloodstock and the stronger line-up which also included Gamma Ray as second billing doubled the festival's attendance to approximately 1500.

2003
2003 brought the first of many expansions to the festival as it stretched across two days.  The first day was headlined by a returning Saxon and the second by Nightwish whom like Blind Guardian the year before were playing their first UK show.  Paul and Gregory had gone on tour with Saxon the previous year and it was then that Vince first saw Nightwish which convinced them they should be booked for the Bloodstock festival.  This year also featured Edguy's first UK show as they were drafted in to replace HammerFall after guitarist Oscar Dronjak broke his arm in a motorcycle accident only weeks before the show. The full line-up was:

2004
2004 saw continued growth in attendance with the festival selling out and brought Gamma Ray back to headline the first day and Children of Bodom headlined the second day. The full line-up was:

2005
2005 was the first year which saw both the indoor and outdoor festivals running.  HammerFall were booked to play, now with a headline slot on the first day, and Within Temptation headlined the second day. The full line-up was:

† Kyrb Grinder were not originally booked to play, but the band members were working at the festival and delays in the running of the Darwin stage left a gap, so they played a short sell to fill in the gap.

2006
2006 was the last year an indoor festival was hosted allowing for full focus on the outdoor festival from then on. Primal Fear headlined day one with My Dying Bride headlining day two and thus being the last ever band to play at Bloodstock as an indoor festival. The full line-up was:

† Tourettes Syndrome had originally been booked to play the main stage. However, their flight was delayed and they did not arrive in time. Sworn Amongst were bumped up from their scheduled Darwin Stage slot to fill the gap, and Tourettes Syndrome played on the Darwin Stage later in the day when they eventually arrived.

Bloodstock Open Air
Bloodstock Open Air is the outdoor venture for the festival after selling out the indoor festival which had a maximum capacity of 2500.  Catton Hall was selected as the venue to allow growth in size without losing the festival's established friendly atmosphere and also maintained its link to Derby.

2005
The festival featured only one stage which was headlined by Sebastian Bach (Friday) and Children of Bodom (Saturday).

2006

Bloodstock Open Air 2006 brought in a second stage called simply "Unsigned Stage". This was to showcase new unsigned acts to a wider audience like the indoor festival did previously to on their second stage.  Now backed by Wacken Open Air, the festival was able to attract more European metal bands to the line-up which was headlined by Edguy (Friday) and Stratovarius (Saturday).  It was the last year which had both the indoor and outdoor festivals running together.

2007

Bloodstock Open Air 2007 brought further growth for the festival which now ran over three days and included three stages.  The additional stage was named the Lava Stage and allowed more established but smaller acts to perform at the festival.  Following a stronger marketing campaign which included advertisement within HMV and greater coverage in music media, attendance at the festival more than doubled from the previous year exceeding 5000 people.  The festival's website also went through a major overhaul and the opportunity was given to unsigned bands to upload their videos.  Following public voting, Costa Rican band Sight Of Emptiness won and were invited to open the main stage on Thursday.  The three mainstage headliners were Testament (Thursday), Lacuna Coil (Friday) and In Flames (Saturday).

BOA 2007 took place from Thursday 16 August to Saturday 18 August. The line up was as follows:

2008

Bloodstock Open Air 2008 took place from Friday 15 August to Sunday 17 August.

2009

Bloodstock Open Air 2009 took place at Catton Hall from Friday 14 August to Sunday 16 August.

2010

Bloodstock Open Air 2010 celebrated the festival's 10th anniversary, and took place between Friday 13 August and Sunday 15 August. The line up was as follows:

 Heaven & Hell were booked to headline on Sunday, but pulled out due to Ronnie James Dio's continuing health issues.
 Shortly after Heaven & Hell pulled out, Dio died. The main stage was later renamed the Ronnie James Dio stage in tribute to him.
 Twisted Sister's headline slot was moved from Friday to Sunday to replace Heaven & Hell. Opeth were then booked to fill the Friday headline slot.
 Dream Evil were confirmed for the mainstage on Friday, but were forced to pull out due to "personal commitments".
 Behemoth were confirmed for the mainstage on Friday, but pulled out due to the hospitalisation of frontman, Adam "Nergal" Darski. Cathedral were announced as their replacements.
 The Sophie Lancaster stage was increased in size and became Bloodstock's second stage. It now plays host to larger, more well known bands, as well as DJs, karaoke, film showings, competitions and more.

2011

Bloodstock Open Air 2011 took place at Catton Hall between Friday 12 August and Sunday 14 August 2011. This year the festival had over 10,900 visitors.

 Nevermore were booked for the Ronnie James Dio stage, but were removed from the official line up in July. No official explanation was released.
 Primevil were booked for the Sophie stage, but were later removed from the official line up. No explanation was released.

2012

Bloodstock Open Air 2012 was scheduled to take place at Catton Hall between Thursday 16 August and Sunday 19 August 2012 (a week later than usual, owing to the festival organisers not wanting the festival to clash with the closing of the 2012 London Olympics); however, the dates were changed to between Thursday 9 August and Sunday 12 August. This change was never officially explained.

 Lock Up were booked to play on the RJD stage on the Friday, but were removed from the lineup. This was later confirmed on the official Bloodstock Twitter page due to logistical problems.
 Deicide were booked to play on the RJD stage on the Sunday, but ended up cancelling the whole European tour that BOA was a part of. Because of this Evile were moved from the Sophie Lancaster Stage to the Ronnie James Dio Stage to fill the void.
 Anthrax were announced for BOA 2013 before Machine Head's Headline set

2013

Bloodstock Open Air 2013 took place at Catton Hall between Thursday 8 August and Sunday 11 August.

Pritchard vs Dainton, Andrew O'Neill & Full Contact Medieval Tournament Combat also appeared at the festival.

*Power Quest's final show before disbanding.

2014

Bloodstock Open Air 2014 took place at Catton Hall between Thursday 7 August and Sunday 10 August.

The line-up was:

Prior to Lamb Of God's set at Bloodstock 2013, Emperor were announced for the 2014 event.
Phil Campbell's All Starr Band were booked to headline Thursday on the Sophie stage but withdrew 2 weeks before the festival due to Phil's Motörhead commitments.
Due to Graveyard's flight being delayed, Graveyard and Avatar swapped slots at last minute.

2015

Bloodstock Open Air 2015 took place at Catton Hall between Thursday 6 August and Sunday 9 August.

The lineup was:

The sideshow Pritchard vs Dainton also appeared at the festival.  The historical battle re-enactment group Battle of the Nations UK have been confirmed.

After Sabaton's set, Venom were announced for the 2016 festival. Also, on the Sunday, Behemoth were announced for BOA 2016 as well.

2016

BOA 2016 took place at Catton Hall between Thursday 11 and Sunday 14 August 2016.

The lineup was:

2017

BOA 2017 took place at Catton Hall between Thursday 10 and Sunday 13 August 2017.

The lineup was:

2018

BOA 2018 took place at Catton Hall between Thursday 9 August and Sunday 12 August 2018.

The lineup was:

2019

BOA 2019 took place at Catton Hall between Thursday 8 August and Sunday 11 August 2019.

The announced lineup was:

Dimmu Borgir were booked to play the Ronnie James Dio stage on Sunday but pulled out due to illness, they were replaced by Batushka.

Code Orange were booked to play the Ronnie James Dio stage on Saturday but pulled out and were replaced by The Wildhearts.

Shvpes were booked to play the Sophie Lancaster stage on Saturday but pulled out and were replaced by Lotus Eater.

Generation Kill were booked to play the Sophie Lancaster stage on Saturday but pulled out and were replaced by Divine Chaos who were also moved up to the Special Guest slot as Skeletal Remains had to pull out as their ferry was cancelled due to bad weather.

Due to windy conditions, the Ronnie James Dio stage was unsafe for use on the Saturday evening, leading to Cradle of Filth being moved to the Sunday, taking Batushka's slot, with Batushka being moved to the Sophie Lancaster Stage, resulting in The Lazys being moved to the New Blood Stage. As well as this, Parkway Drive's and Anthrax's performances were both delayed until the Stage was deemed safe to use.

2020
BOA 2020 was due to take place at Catton Hall between Thursday, 6 August and Sunday, 9 August 2020 but was postponed due to the COVID-19 pandemic.

The announced lineup at the time of postponement was:

The Black Dahlia Murder were booked to play the Ronnie James Dio stage on Sunday but pulled out of all European summer shows due to the COVID-19 pandemic.

2021

BOA 2021 took place at Catton Hall between Wednesday 11 August and Sunday 15 August 2021. This is an extra day to the usual length of the festival owing to the postponement of the 2020 event.

Brian Blessed appeared at the festival on Sunday 15 August 2021, Brian announced Saxon onto the stage on the Sunday evening.

Loathe were scheduled to perform on the Ronnie James Dio stage on Friday 13 August 2021 but they pulled out due to a member testing positive for COVID 19, they were replaced by Higher Power

Sylosis were scheduled to perform on the Ronnie James Dio stage on Saturday 14 August 2021 but due to Josh Middleton having to self isolate after coming into contact with someone who had tested positive for COVID 19 at an Architects album release show, they were forced to pull out of the festival.

2022

Bloodstock 2022 took place from 11–14 August 2022. 17 bands were announced, including headliners Lamb of God and Saturday Ronnie James Dio stage headliner Mercyful Fate.

Life of Agony had to pull out due to a medical emergency, resulting in Skarlett Riot taking a slot on the main stage.
On the Friday, Machine Head played an hour-long unannounced set on the Sophie Lancaster Stage

2023
Bloodstock Festival 2023 will take place August 10th - August 13th 2023. 8 bands were announced after Testament's set in 2022, including headliners Killswitch Engage and Megadeth. 

Russkaja were scheduled to perform but broke up before the festival began. Anthrax and  Whitechapel were also due to perform but pulled out of the festival.

See also
List of music festivals in the United Kingdom

References

External links

Music festivals in Derbyshire
Heavy metal festivals in England
Music festivals established in 2005
2005 establishments in England